The 2016 IAAF Road Race Label Events were the ninth edition of the global series of road running competitions given Label status by the International Association of Athletics Federations (IAAF). The series included all six World Marathon Majors in the Gold category. The series included a total of 88 road races: 44 Gold, 17 Silver and 27 Bronze. In terms of distance, 59 races were marathons, 19 were half marathons, 8 were 10K runs, and 2 were held over other distances.

Races

References

Race calendar
Calendar 2016 IAAF Label Road Races. IAAF. Retrieved 2019-09-22.

2016
IAAF Road Race Label Events